KSIR (1010 AM) is a radio station broadcasting a News Talk Information format. Licensed to Brush, Colorado, United States, the station is currently owned by Northeast Colorado Broadcasting LLC and features programming from ABC Radio.

History
The station was assigned the call letters KKGZ on August 22, 1985. The current call letters were used in Denver, Colorado from 1991 to 1993, then the call letters came here. On April 26, 1993, the station changed its call sign to the current KSIR.

References

External links
FCC History Cards for KSIR

News and talk radio stations in the United States
SIR